4-(4-Methylphenyl)-4-oxobutanoic acid is an organic carboxylic acid. The preparation of it is used for undergraduate teaching of organic chemistry synthesis.

Preparation 
4-(4-Methylphenyl)-4-oxobutanoic acid can be prepared by a Friedel–Crafts reaction between toluene and succinic anhydride  catalyzed by a Lewis acid such as aluminium chloride.

References 

Carboxylic acids
Phenyl compounds
Aromatic ketones